Passage ~Best Collection~ is a greatest hits album by Japanese singer Rina Chinen, released on March 23, 2000 by Sony Music Entertainment Japan. The album compiles Chinen's singles from 1996 to 2000 and includes the new song "Again".

The album peaked at No. 10 on Oricon's albums chart.

Track listing

Charts

References

External links 
 
 
 

2000 compilation albums
Japanese-language compilation albums
Sony Music Entertainment Japan compilation albums